The 2021 K League 2 was the ninth season of the K League 2, the second-tier South Korean professional league for association football clubs since its establishment in 2013, and the fourth one with its current name, the K League 2. The top-ranked team and the winner of the promotion-relegation play-off got promoted to the 2022 K League 1.

On 21 January 2021, the Korean Professional Football Union confirmed that the 2021 season of K League 2 would begin on 27 February with 36 regular season matches per team.

Teams

New Team 
Sangju Sangmu was renamed to Gimcheon Sangmu and was relegated to K League 2 and moved to Gimcheon, North Gyeongsang, South Korea ahead for 2021 season after the club was dissolved in the 2020 season.

Stadiums

Personnel and kits

Note: Flags indicate national team as has been defined under FIFA eligibility rules. Players may hold more than one non-FIFA nationality.

Managerial changes

Foreign players
Restricting the number of foreign players strictly to five per team, including a slot for a player from AFC and ASEAN countries. Gimcheon Sangmu FC, being a military-owned team, is not allowed to sign any foreign players. A team could use four foreign players on the field each game. Players in bold are players who join midway through the competition.  An Byong-jun, playing for Busan IPark, was deemed to be a native player.

League table

Positions by matchday

Results

Matches 1–18

Matches 19–36

Promotion-relegation playoffs
The semi-playoff is contested between the 3rd and 4th placed teams in the K League 2. The winners advance to the playoff to face the 2nd placed team in the K League 2, and the winners advance to the promotion-relegation playoffs to match against the 11th placed team in the K League 1. The winners of that tie secure a place in the 2022 K League 1.

If scores are tied after regular time in the semi-playoff and playoff rounds, the higher-placed team will advance to the next phase. The same conditions do not apply for the promotion-relegation playoffs, which are held instead over two legs.

Semi-playoff

Playoff

Promotion-relegation playoffs

Season statistics

Top scorers

Top assists

Awards

Most Valuable Player of the Round

Season Awards
The 2021 K League Awards was held on 18 November 2021.

K League 2 Most Valuable Player

The K League 2 Most Valuable Player award was won by  An Byong-jun (Busan IPark).

K League 2 Young Player

The K League 2 Young Player award was won by  Kim In-kyun (Chungnam Asan).

K League 2 Top Scorer

The K League 2 Top Scorer award was won by  An Byong-jun (Busan IPark).

K League 2 Top Assistor

The K League 2 Top Assistor award was won by  Joo Hyeon-woo (FC Anyang).

K League 2 Best XI

K League Manager of the Year
The K League Manager of the Year award was won by  Kim Tae-wan (Gimcheon Sangmu).

Controversies 
On December 12, 2021, Gangwon FC and Daejeon Hana Citizen faced one another in the second leg of the Promotion-relegation play-offs, with the latter team finding himself in advantage after winning the first leg 1–0. Played at Gangneung Stadium, Gangwon's home soil, the match saw the hosts secure a 4-1 comeback victory and maintain their spot in K League 1. However, the game was marred by a series of incidents, occurring between the first and the second half. After Han Kook-young had scored Gangwon's third goal in the 31st minute, the ball boys around the stadium reportedly started to delay giving the ball back to Daejeon players, an event that happened multiple times during the match and was possibly meant to waste time in favour of the hosts: the fans in the away sector reacted furiously, with some of them throwing plastic bottles in direction of one of the ball boys. The game still went ahead, as six minutes of extra time were added at the end of the second half. The K League administration decided to open an official investigation on the controversial events.

When asked to talk about the incidents, Gangwon's director Lee Young-pyo originally dismissed them, pointing out that similar instances were already common in European football, but later apologized, saying that he felt "direct responsibility" for the "unsmooth match" and promising that he would work so that Gangwon FC would become "a mature club" in the future. Meanwhile, on December 21, just hours before K League's final disciplinary meeting took place, the Daejeon board released an official response to the matter, stating that there was "clear evidence of the game delays being intentional and organized", as well as noticing that such acts violated the league's Code of Ethics for fair play and respect.

In the end, the league's administration decided to keep the final score unchanged: however, Gangwon FC was fined 30 million Korean Won ($25,000) for the episodes of time wasting, whereas Daejeon Hana Citizen was fined 2 million Korean Won ($1,677) for their fans' behavior towards one of the ball boys.

See also
 2021 K League 1

Notes

References

External links
 Official K League website

K League 2 seasons
2
K